Samantha Brianna Fisher (born September 19, 1995) is a Canadian curler from Kamloops, British Columbia. She is the lead  for the Corryn Brown rink.

Career

Junior career
Fisher first joined the Corryn Brown rink at age 11. Playing second for the team, Fisher won a gold medal at the 2011 Canada Winter Games for British Columbia after winning the 2010 BC Winter games gold medal. They represented the province at the 2013 Canadian Junior Curling Championships, which they also won. This qualified the team to represent Canada at the 2013 World Junior Curling Championships, where they finished with a 3–6 record. The team lost in the finals of the BC Juniors the following year. The team began the 2014–15 season by winning the Coronation Business Group Classic event on the World Curling Tour (WCT). Later in the year, the team won the 2015 BC Juniors. At the 2015 Canadian Junior Curling Championships, the team finished in third place. The same year, the team won a silver medal at the 2015 CIS/CCA Curling Championships for Thompson Rivers University. The next season, the team lost in the finals of the 2016 BC juniors. Later on that year, the team won another silver medal for Thompson Rivers at the 2016 CIS/CCA Curling Championships. In her final season in juniors, Fisher moved from second to lead on the team after the addition of Dezaray Hawes to the rink at second. With the new lineup, the Brown rink won their third BC junior women's championship. At the 2017 Canadian Junior Curling Championships, the team finished with a 5–5 record, missing the playoffs. On the World Curling Tour that season, the team won the 2016 Qinghai China Women's International.

Women's career
In their first season out of juniors, the Brown rink played in the 2018 British Columbia Scotties Tournament of Hearts, where they lost to Karla Thompson in the semifinal. Later on that season, the team represented Thompson Rivers once again at the 2018 National University championships, winning a third silver medal.

Wanting to focus on her studies, Fisher did not curl competitively between 2018 and 2020 (except for playing at the 2019 BC Mixed Doubles championship), and was replaced on the Brown rink by Ashley Klymchuk. After Fisher graduated, and Klymchuk became pregnant with twins and Fisher re-joined the team. In her first season back on the team, they won the Kelowna Double Cash WCT event. The 2021 British Columbia Scotties Tournament of Hearts was cancelled due to the COVID-19 pandemic in British Columbia, so Curl BC appointed the Brown rink (who had won the 2020 British Columbia Scotties Tournament of Hearts without Fisher) as the team's representatives at the 2021 Scotties Tournament of Hearts, Canada's national women's championship – Fisher's first. At the Hearts, they finished a 4–4 round robin record, failing to qualify for the championship round.

Personal life
Fisher attended Valleyview Secondary School in Kamloops. She graduated from Thompson Rivers University in 2020 with a diploma in respiratory therapy, and immediately began work for Interior Health at the Royal Inland Hospital.  Fisher's father, Brian was one of her team's junior coaches and represented BC at the 1990 Canadian Junior Curling Championships. She is married to fellow curler Jared Kolomaya.

References

Canadian women curlers
1995 births
Curlers from British Columbia
Living people
Sportspeople from Kamloops